Surplus: Terrorized Into Being Consumers is a 2003 Swedish documentary film on consumerism and globalization, created by director Erik Gandini and editor Johan Söderberg. It looks at the arguments for capitalism and technology, such as greater efficiency, more time and less work, and argues that these are not being fulfilled, and they never will be. The film leans towards anarcho-primitivist ideology and argues for 'a simple and fulfilling life'.

Synopsis 
Opening 
Footage of the protests at the 27th G8 summit in Genoa.
Fidel Castro gives a speech.
John Zerzan
John Zerzan is interviewed.
RealDoll
RealDoll manufacturer gives a tour of his warehouse, showing the variety and cost of the sex-dolls.
Cuba
Mirta Muñes shows the Cuban ration card, Cuban toothpaste.
Pre Fidel Speech Parade, Fidel going up to the pulpit.
Tania speaks about having gone out of Cuba, amazed by supermarkets, McDonald's, and gaining a lot of weight.
Internet
Internet-wealthy Svante says he hates money, feels empty.
John Zerzan on emptiness in consumer society.
Ballmer's monkeyboy dance and then "I love this company" statement intermixed with workers stretching, then Fidel Castro lip-synched to "I love this company".
footage from Alang, India where it says 40,000 workers scrap ships to recycle steel.
John Zerzan speech saying violent protesting is better than peaceful protesting, intermixed with a car show, and protesting.
New Ethic
John Zerzan says corporate property of Starbucks or similar is the main target of his criticism due to being understood as destructive and wiping out freedom and diversity.
footage of primitive man.
landfills, with conclusion: there is a paradigm shift coming where people will not want corporate products and will desire a simple, fulfilling life. This can be understood ironically.
Credits

Views 

It prominently features the views of anarcho-primitivist John Zerzan.

Talking Heads 
John Zerzan, anarcho-primitivist writer, editor of Against Civilization: A Reader (1998)
Fidel Castro, President of Cuba
Kalle Lasn, from Adbusters
Svante Tidholm, from Stockholm, Sweden, a wealthy web-designer of Spray and author of the autobiographical novel Loser (Wahlström & Widstrand, 1998, Swedish)
Carlo Giuliani, Activist and anarchist killed during Anti-G8 demonstrations in Genoa, 2001

Criticizes 
George W. Bush, President of the United States
Steve Ballmer, CEO of Microsoft from 2000 to 2014
Bill Gates, Chairman of the Board and Chief Software Architect of Microsoft

Style 

Surplus uses many montages.

Surplus overtly uses lip-synching to put words in the mouth of people who hold similar world powering positions. Examples of this are George W. Bush speaking for Adbusters, Fidel Castro mouthing the words of Microsoft CEO Steve Ballmer: "I love this company! Yeah!"

Soundtrack listing 
Gotan Project - Triptico
Tosca - Orozco
Aphrodelics - Aphrodelics – Rollin' on Chrome (Wild Motherfucker dub)
Marc O´Sullivan (The Mighty Quark) - Smokescreen
Marc O´Sullivan (The Mighty Quark) - Theme from Good People
Johan Söderberg and David Österberg - No-tech-no
Johan Söderberg and David Österberg - Rice&Beans
Johan Söderberg and David Österberg - 18 Miljener

There is much repetition of footage and soundtrack; no more so than in ancient Pali dhammasutras; but certainly at least as boring; and without their excuse that in an oral tradition the technique was necessary to learn the words for their public recitation.

Locations 
 Genoa, Italy - 27th G8 summit (2001)
 Shanghai, China - Stock Exchange
 Alang, India - Metal reclaiming
 United States / Cuba / Hungary / Sweden / Canada

Awards 
IDFA Competition for Mid-Length Documentary, 2003

References

External links 
 Official website

Surplus: Terrorized into Being Consumers Direct download (free)
The film in its entirety on Youtube.

2003 films
Anti-modernist films
Films directed by Erik Gandini
Documentary films about globalization
Documentary films about consumerism
Documentary films about politics
Swedish documentary films
2003 documentary films
2000s Swedish films